The British Columbia Premier Baseball League, commonly referred to as the BCPBL or the PBL, is a competitive youth baseball league consisting of 13 teams located throughout British Columbia, Canada.  Over the years, the BCPBL has served as a talent pipeline for Major League Baseball as numerous BCPBL players have been selected in the Major League Baseball entry draft and gone on to have successful careers in professional baseball.

League History
Known as the Island Premier Baseball League when it was founded in 1995, the league originally included only five teams, all from Vancouver Island: Victoria Investors, Victoria Selects, Mid-Island Canadians, Nanaimo Pirates and the Parksville Royals.  Although these five teams had been playing exhibition games against teams from the Lower Mainland, only in 1999 did the league officially expand to include six new teams: North Shore Twins, Vancouver Mounties, Coquitlam Reds, North Delta Blue Jays, White Rock Tritons, and Abbotsford Cardinals.

In 2000, the league expanded once again by adding two more teams: the Whalley Chiefs and Penticton.  Later that year, the league changed its name to the British Columbia Premier Baseball league to reflect its new membership.

In 2009, the PBL would again expand, by bringing a team back to Vancouver known as the Vancouver Cannons. In 2010, the PBL board has granted a second PBL franchise to Victoria, known as the Victoria Eagles. Also the team formerly known as the Kelowna Cubs became known as the Okanagan Athletics in the 2010 season.

Teams

Notable alumni

Several well known ballplayers have played Major League Baseball:

† James Paxton (North Delta Blue Jays)
† Nick Pivetta (Victoria Eagles)
† Rowan Wick (Vancouver Cannons and Whalley Chiefs)
† Tyler O'Neill (Langley Blaze)
Larry Walker (Coquitlam Reds), MLB Hall of Famer
Ryan Dempster (North Shore Twins)
Jeff Francis (North Delta Blue Jays)
Taylor Green (Parksville Royals)
Rich Harden (Victoria Mariners)
Brett Lawrie (Langley Blaze)
Adam Loewen (Whalley Chiefs)
Scott Mathieson (Langley Blaze)
Justin Morneau (North Delta Blue Jays)
Aaron Myette (Whalley Chiefs)
Kevin Nicholson (Whalley Chiefs)
Michael Saunders (Victoria Mariners)
Rene Tosoni (Coquitlam Reds)

† active player

Many well known ex-BCPBL players have gone on to have successful minor league baseball careers:

 Cole Armstrong (Whalley Chiefs)
 Shawn Bowman (Coquitlam Reds)
 Leon Boyd (White Rock Tritons)
 Kellin Deglan (Langley Blaze)
 Bryan Dumesnil (Nanaimo Pirates)
 Jordan Lennerton
 Kyle Lotzkar
 Jared Mortensen
 Vince Perkins (Parksville Royals)
 Jimmy Van Ostrand
 Terrance Dayleg (Whalley Chiefs)

Past champions

References

External links
B.C. Premier League

Baseball in British Columbia
Summer baseball leagues
Baseball leagues in Canada
Base
Sports leagues established in 1995
1995 establishments in British Columbia